Hrnčár is a surname. Notable people with the surname include:

David Hrnčár (born 1997), Slovak footballer, son of Norbert
Eduard Hrnčár (born 1978), Slovak footballer
Norbert Hrnčár (born 1970), Slovak footballer and manager

Slovak-language surnames